Joevannie Peart (born May 14, 1984) is a Canadian former soccer player who played in the Canadian Professional Soccer League, Nemzeti Bajnokság I, V.League 1, and Nemzeti Bajnokság II.

Playing career 
Peart played at the college level in 2003 with Western Nebraska Community College. He later transferred to University of Cincinnati. He played at the professional career in his native city of Mississauga in the Canadian Professional Soccer League with the Mississauga Olympians. In 2005, Peart went abroad to Hungary to sign with Lombard-Pápa TFC  in the Nemzeti Bajnokság I, where he played for three years, appearing in 18 matches and recording 1 goal. He went overseas to Vietnam to sign with Bình Dương F.C. in 2008. 

During his tenure with Bình Dương he won the Vietnamese National Cup, Vietnamese Super Cup, and the V-League championship. In 2008, he returned to Hungary to sign with Integrál-DAC, and in 2011 he returned to Canada to play with the Mississauga Eagles FC in the Canadian Soccer League.

On August 2, 2018 he was wanted as part of a serious investigation conducted by the Toronto Police Service, as the 7th suspect identified with involvement in numerous illegal firearm and narcotics trafficking offences. On December 11, 2018 he was charged with trafficking of illegal drugs and firearms throughout the Golden Horseshoe in Ontario, Canada.

Honors

Bình Dương
V.League 1 Championship (1): 2008
Vietnamese National Cup (1): 2008
Vietnamese Super Cup (1): 2008

External links  
 2017 WNCC Soccer Record Book

References  

1984 births
Living people
Soccer players from Mississauga
Association football forwards
Canadian soccer players
Canadian expatriate soccer players
Canadian Soccer League (1998–present) players
Toronto (Mississauga) Olympians players
Lombard-Pápa TFC footballers
Becamex Binh Duong FC players
Integrál-DAC footballers
Mississauga Eagles FC players
Nemzeti Bajnokság I players
Nemzeti Bajnokság II players
V.League 1 players
Canadian expatriate sportspeople in the United States
Expatriate soccer players in the United States
Cincinnati Bearcats men's soccer players
Western Nebraska Community College
Canadian expatriate sportspeople in Vietnam
Expatriate footballers in Vietnam
Canadian expatriate sportspeople in Hungary
Expatriate footballers in Hungary
Canadian drug traffickers